Allan Macdonald (November 21, 1794 White Plains, Westchester County, New York – January 1862) was an American politician from New York.

Life
He was the son of Dr. Archibald Macdonald (d. 1813), a native of Scotland.

Allan Macdonald was Postmaster of White Plains from before 1825 until after 1833, and Sheriff of Westchester County from 1826 to 1828.

He was a member of the New York State Senate (2nd D.) from 1832 to 1835, sitting in the 55th, 56th, 57th and 58th New York State Legislatures.

He was Adjutant General of the New York State Militia from 1836 to 1838.

He was co-owner, with his brother Dr. James Macdonald (1803–1849), of a private insane asylum located since 1845 at Sanford Hall, the former residence of Chancellor Nathan Sanford (1777–1838) in Flushing, Queens.

Sources
The New York Civil List compiled by Franklin Benjamin Hough (pages 129f, 146 and 410; Weed, Parsons and Co., 1858)
The New York Civil List (1867; pg. 244)
Register of Officers and Agents in the Service of the United States (1831; pg. 369)
Obituary of his brother, in The American Journal of Insanity (1849; pg. 71—92)
Obituary in Littell's Living Age (Vol. 72, 1862; pg. 456)

1794 births
1862 deaths
People from White Plains, New York
New York (state) state senators
New York (state) postmasters
New York (state) sheriffs
American people of Scottish descent
19th-century American politicians